Cycling at the 1996 Summer Paralympics consisted of 23 events in two disciplines, road cycling and track cycling.

Medal table

Participating nations

Medal summary

Road cycling

Track cycling

See also
Cycling at the 1996 Summer Olympics

References 

 

1996 Summer Paralympics events
1996
Paralympics
1996 in road cycling
1996 in track cycling